Fußach is a municipality in the district of Bregenz in the Austrian state of Vorarlberg.

Population

References

Cities and towns in Bregenz District